Shefqet Topi (1934–1998) was an Albanian footballer who played most of his professional career as a goalkeeper for Besa Kavajë football club. He was also capped with the Albania National Football Team in the early 1960s.

A picture of an acrobatic save by Topi in a match against 17 Nëntori in 1961 became one of Albania's most iconic football photo's.

International career
He made his debut for Albania in a September 1957 friendly match away against China and earned a total of 2 caps, scoring no goals. His other international game was an October 1963 European Championship qualification match against Denmark.

Honours
Albanian Superliga: 1
 1957

References

External links

1934 births
1998 deaths
Footballers from Kavajë
Albanian footballers
Association football goalkeepers
Albania international footballers
FK Partizani Tirana players
Besa Kavajë players
Kategoria Superiore players